Sushko is a gender-neutral Slavic surname that may refer to

 Hennadiy Sushko (born 1970), Ukrainian football coach and former player
 Iryna Sushko (born 1967), Ukrainian mathematician
 Maxim Sushko (born 1999), Belarusian ice hockey forward
 Orest Sushko, re-recording film mixer
 Pavlo Sushko (born 1979). Ukrainian politician
 Vadim Sushko (born 1986), Belarusian ice hockey defenceman
 Yuriy Sushko (born 1979), Ukrainian serial killer

East Slavic-language surnames